The Great Flat Lode is a mineral-bearing body of rock under the southern granite slopes of Carn Brea south of Camborne in west Cornwall, England, UK.

Mining

The Great Flat Lode lies under the southern granite slopes of Carn Brea and so named because the tin-bearing rock was at an unusually shallow gradient of about 10 degrees to the horizontal. In other parts of Cornwall mineral bearing lodes lie at between 60 and 90 degrees to the horizontal. "Lode" is a mining term for a mineral vein.  Its small gradient allowed for optimal location of the mines. The minerals were accessed by the South Condurrow Mine (later renamed King Edward Mine and used by the Camborne School of Mines), Wheal Grenville, South Wheal Frances Mine and the Bassett Mines. The mines were started to obtain copper ore but at greater depths tin was obtained.

Many of the mines amalgamated and continued production until the First World War.

Trail

References
Footnotes

Bibliography

Further reading

 Acton, Bob - Exploring Cornwall's Tramway Trails, vol. 1: Great Flat Lode Trail, 1996, reprinted 2001,

External links
The Wheal Buller Project tells the story of the Count House and of Old Wheal Buller Mine which overlooks the Great Flat Lode Trail

Cycleways in Cornwall
Rail trails in England
Geology of Cornwall
Mining in Cornwall